</noinclude>

Kateřina Šišková (Kateřina Kroupová, born 20 February 1974) is a former professional Czech tennis player.

In career she won eight singles and 12 doubles titles on the ITF circuit. On 4 January 1993, she reached her best singles ranking of world number 58. On 7 August 1995, she peaked at number 104 in the WTA doubles rankings.

WTA career finals

Doubles (0–1)

ITF finals

Singles (8–3)

Doubles (12–12)

Grand Slam performance timelines

Singles

Doubles

External links
 
  (1990–1998)
  (2000–2013)

References

1974 births
Living people
Czech female tennis players
Czechoslovak female tennis players